This is a list of major sports controversies in the Philippines or concerning Filipino sportspeople. These controversies cover areas such as rules, match fixing, cheating, sportsmanship, doping and sport administration. They have generated large scale media coverage over a period of time and may have resulted in a large scale inquiry. These controversies affect the integrity of sport. This excludes non-sporting controversy that happened to involve sportspeople.

List

Involving athletes and coaches

Leadership and organizational issues

References

 
Sports
History of sports in the Philippines
Philippines sport-related lists